Vanderbilt University in Nashville, Tennessee, has graduated a number of athletes. This includes graduates, non-graduate former students and current students of Vanderbilt who are notable for their achievements within athletics, sometimes before or after their time at Vanderbilt. Intercollegiate sports teams at Vanderbilt are known as the "Commodores", due to founder Cornelius Vanderbilt's sobriquet.

Vanderbilt University currently sponsors teams in six men's and ten women's NCAA sanctioned sports: men's baseball, men's and women's basketball, women's bowling, men's and women's cross country, men's and women's golf, women's lacrosse, women's soccer, women's swimming, men's and women's tennis, and women's track and field.

Well-known American football athletes include former students Jay Cutler, Jamie Duncan, Shelton Quarles, and Will Wolford, former Vanderbilt football coaches Dan McGugin, Wallace Wade, and Red Sanders, and all-time greats such as Lynn Bomar, Josh Cody, Bucky Curtis, Carl Hinkle, Bill Spears, John J. Tigert, and Bill Wade. Former Vanderbilt chemistry professor William Lofland Dudley was known as the "father of Southern football." Vanderbilt's entrants into the NBA include Charles Davis, Festus Ezeli, Shan Foster, John Jenkins, Dan Langhi, Clyde Lee, and Will Perdue.  Award-winning baseball stars include Pedro Alvarez, David Price, Scotti Madison, and Mike Minor. Sportswriters Grantland Rice and Fred Russell had both been members of the baseball team.

Olympics

American football

Baseball

Antoan Richardson (born 1983), Bahamian Major League Baseball outfielder and coach

Basketball

Golf

Soccer

Tennis

References

Vanderbilt University athletes
Athletes